The Committee on Economic, Social and Cultural Rights (CESCR) is a United Nations treaty body entrusted with overseeing the implementation of the International Covenant on Economic, Social and Cultural Rights (ICESCR). It is composed of 18 experts.

It meets (usually twice per year) to consider measures which States parties to the International Covenant on Economic, Social and Cultural Rights (ICESCR) have taken, progress they made and obstacles they have encountered in achieving the observance of the rights recognized in the ICESCR.

The Committee's 18 members come from different countries. They serve in their personal capacity, meaning they are not UN staff, are not paid a salary to sit on the Committee, and do not represent their country of citizenship. Like the other human rights treaty monitoring bodies, the CESCR is tasked with the interpretation and monitoring of a specific treaty (the ICESCR in this case). The CESCR carries out its mandate by reviewing periodically the implementation of the treaty in each country that has ratified it, developing ‘general comments’ that interpret specific provisions of the treaty, and adjudicating individual complaints. 

CESCR Members are elected for a term of four years by the ECOSOC, in accordance with ECOSOC Resolution 1985/17 of 28 May 1985. 

Members serve in their personal capacity and may be re-elected if nominated.

Members

References

Dommen & Sepulveda (2017). The Obligation to Mobilise Resources: Bridging Human Rights, Sustainable Development Goals,
and Economic and Fiscal Policies, at: https://www.ibanet.org/Human_Rights_Institute/Publications.

External links
 OHCHR | Membership: 

Intergovernmental human rights organizations
Quasi-judicial bodies
United Nations Economic and Social Council
United Nations organizations based in Geneva